Two of a Kind (literally "Naughty Gemini") is a 1989 Hong Kong modern teen television drama created and produced by TVB, starring  Hacken Lee, Paul Wong, Yu Sin Man, Cutie Mui, Steve Wong, Aaron Kwok, Paul Chun, Kiki Sheung as the main cast and was produced by popular TVB producer Mui Siu-ching. First original broadcast began on Hong Kong's Jade channel July 10 till July 21, 1989 every Monday through Friday during its 7:35 to 8:35 pm timeslot with a total of 10 episodes.

Synopsis
Fed up with being mistreated by his new step-father and his mother not caring Cha Sing Yu (Hacken Lee) boards a plane from the U.S. and runs away to Hong Kong to look for his father. When he lands in Hong Kong he heads to his father's office only to find out his father is away on a business trip but he does run into his fraternal twin brother Cha Sing Chow (Paul Wong) at the office. Sing Yu follows Sing Chow and befriends him, Sing Yu is also able to talk Sing chow into taking him in that night. Sing Yu talks Sing Chow into having fun that night and the two get drunk.

Their dad comes home finding the both of them drunk and that Sing Yu has returned to Hong Kong alone. The next day Sing Yu registered for school where he meets the rest of Sing Chow's classmates. Everyone welcomes him except Sheung Yan Yin (Yu Sin-man), who had an unpleasant run in with Sing Yu the day before. She instantly becomes Sing Yu's enemies but Sing Chow also has a crush on her. Meanwhile classmate Lee Sai Sai goes out of her way to help Sing Yu to adjust to life in Hong Kong since she has a crush on him.

As Sing Yu, Sing Chow and their friends transition from student to young adult life each face their own difficulty. Sing Yu must choose to follow his dreams of becoming a tennis player or continue his university studies. While Sing Chow comes to terms that Yan Yin does not have romantic feelings for him and must move on with his life.

Cast

Students
Hacken Lee as Cha Sing Yu (查星宇) 
Paul Wong as Cha Sing Chow (查星宙)
Yu Sin-man as Sheung Yan Yin (常欣然)
Cutie Mui as Lee Sai Sai (李西西) 
Steve Wong as Yeung Yau Chi (楊有智) (Dr. YY)
Aaron Kwok as Chui Yik (徐翊; nickname Dongguan Boy 東莞仔)
Sarah Wong as Momoko To (桃芷美; To Chi May)
Brian Wong as Yuen Siu Kau (袁小球)
Ciyk Wong as Billy Cheung (張耀邦; Cheung Yiu Bong)

School faculty
Law Kwok-wai as school principal (校長)
Kiki Sheung as Sheung Yin Yin (常嫣然) 
Andy Tai as Ha Hin Yeung (夏顯揚)
Wai Yee-yan as Miss Chan
Lee Tim-sing as Chu Sir (朱Sir)

Parents
Paul Chun as Charles Cha (查萬里; Cha Man Lei)
Amy Wu as Lydia Chung (鍾迪雅; Chung Dik Nga)
Wong Chun as Lee King (李勁)

Extended cast
Constance Cheng as Siu Yuen (小阮)
Candy Wong 
Ng Shui-ting
Mak Chi-wan
Suen Kwai-hing
Kit Chan
Gordon Lam
Ying Man-woo
Lee Wei-ming
Lily Liew
Evergreen Mak

Soundtrack
Days Gone By (逝去日子) by Beyond
Walk with You (與妳共行) by Beyond
Youthful Dreams (夢少年) by Hacken Lee

References

External links
 

TVB dramas
1989 Hong Kong television series debuts
1989 Hong Kong television series endings
Cantonese-language television shows